Linkin Park is an American rock band from Agoura Hills, California. Originally consisting of three high school friends, Linkin Park's foundation was anchored by Mike Shinoda and Brad Delson along with Rob Bourdon. After graduating from high school, the California natives began to take their musical interests more seriously, recruiting Joe Hahn, Dave "Phoenix" Farrell, and Mark Wakefield to perform in their band then titled Xero. Though limited in resources, the band began recording and producing songs within Shinoda's makeshift bedroom studio in 1996. After they failed to land a record deal, however, tensions and frustration within the band grew, and the lack of success and stalemate in progress prompted Wakefield, at that time the band's vocalist, to leave the band in search for other projects.

Linkin Park released its debut album Hybrid Theory on October 24, 2000. In 2002, the band won a Grammy Award for Best Hard Rock Performance. Linkin Park's second album Meteora sold more than 800,000 copies during its first week, and it ranked as the best selling album on the Billboard charts at the time. "Breaking the Habit", a single from the album, won an MTV Asia Award. "Somewhere I Belong", also on Meteora, won a MTV Video Music Award. After the success of Meteora, the band postponed working on a new studio album for several years. Linkin Park continued to tour and work on side projects; during the same period, Bennington appeared on DJ Lethal’s State of the Art and worked with Dead By Sunrise, while Shinoda worked with Depeche Mode. In 2004, the band worked with Jay-Z to produce an album entitled Collision Course; "Numb/Encore", a single from the album, won a Grammy Award the next year. Linkin Park's next album Minutes To Midnight was released in 2007 despite initially stating the album would debut in 2006. The album was nominated for a TMF Award in 2007, while "What I've Done", a single from the album, was nominated for an MTV Video Music Award. Linkin Park has won in the Favourite International Artist of Asia category at the 2008 MTV Asia Awards. Overall, Linkin Park has received a total of 67 awards from  197 nominations. Their next album was A Thousand Suns released in 2010 and the fifth album Living Things was released in June, 2012.

UN Global Leadership Award
On November 8, 2011, the band was awarded the UN Global Leadership Award for their humanitarian philanthropy via their Music for Relief non-profit, and fundraising $500,000 USD to the Save the Children charity following the events of the 2011 Tōhoku earthquake and tsunami.

American Music Awards
The American Music Award are awarded for outstanding achievements in the record industry. Linkin Park has received six awards from ten nominations. They currently held the record for most wins and nominations in its Favorite Alternative Artist category.

|-
|rowspan="2" align="center"| 2003(January) ||rowspan="2"| Linkin Park || Favorite Alternative Artist || 
|-
| Favorite Pop/Rock Band/Duo/Group || 
|-
|align="center"| 2003(November) || Linkin Park || Favorite Alternative Artist || 
|-
|align="center"| 2004 || Linkin Park || Favorite Alternative Artist || 
|-
|rowspan="3" align="center"| 2007 ||rowspan="2"| Linkin Park || Favorite Alternative Artist || 
|-
| Favorite Pop/Rock Band/Duo/Group || 
|-
| Minutes To Midnight || Favorite Pop/Rock Album || 
|-
|align="center"| 2008 ||| Linkin Park || Favorite Alternative Artist || 
|-
|align="center"| 2012 ||Linkin Park || Favorite Alternative Artist || 
|-
|align="center"| 2017 ||| Linkin Park || Favorite Alternative Artist ||

Billboard Music Awards
The Billboard Music Awards, sponsored by Billboard magazine was one of several annual United States music awards shows. Linkin Park were nominated for six awards in the 2011 ceremony.

|-
|rowspan="3"| 2001 || rowspan="3"| Linkin Park || Modern Rock Artist Of The Year || 
|-
|Rock Artist of the Year || 
|-
|New Artist Of The Year || 
|-
|rowspan="2"| 2002 || Linkin Park ||Duo Or Group Artist Of The Year|| 
|-
| "In the End" || Modern Rock Track Of The Year || 
|-
|rowspan="2"| 2003 ||rowspan="2" | Linkin Park || Duo Or Group Artist Of The Year || 
|-
| Modern Rock Artist Of The Year || 
|-
|| 2004 || Linkin Park || Duo Or Group Artist Of The Year || 
|-
|rowspan="6"| 2011 ||rowspan="3" | Linkin Park || Top Duo/Group || 
|-
| Top Rock Artist || 
|-
| Top Alternative Artist || 
|-
|rowspan="2" | A Thousand Suns || Top Rock Album || 
|-
| Top Alternative Album || 
|-
| "Waiting for the End" || Top Alternative Song || 
|-
|rowspan="3"| 2018 || Linkin Park || Top Rock Artist || 
|-
| One More Light || Top Rock Album || 
|-
| "Heavy" <small>(featuring Kiiara) || Top Rock Song ||

Grammy Awards
The Grammy Awards are awarded annually by the National Academy of Recording Arts and Sciences. Linkin Park has received two awards from six nominations.

|-
|rowspan="3"|  || "Crawling" || Best Hard Rock Performance || 
|-
| Hybrid Theory || Best Rock Album || 
|-
| Linkin Park || Best New Artist || 
|-
|  || "Session" || Best Rock Instrumental Performance || 
|-
|  || "Numb/Encore" (with Jay-Z) || Best Rap/Sung Collaboration || 
|-
|  || "What I've Done" (Road To Revolution: Live At Milton Keynes) || Best Hard Rock Performance ||  
|-

iHeartRadio Music Awards
The iHeartRadio Music Awards is an international music awards show founded by iHeartRadio in 2014. Linkin Park has received one award from one nomination.

|-
| 2018 || One More Light || Rock Album of the Year ||

MTV Awards

MTV Europe Music Awards
The MTV Europe Music Awards were established in 1994 by MTV Europe to celebrate the most popular music videos in Europe. Linkin Park has received 10 awards from twenty two nominations.

|-
| 2001 || Linkin Park || Best Rock || 
|-
|rowspan="3"|  2002 || rowspan="2"|Linkin Park || Best Hard Rock || 
|-
| Best Group || 
|-
| www.linkinpark.com || Web Award || 
|-
| 2003 || Linkin Park || Best Rock || 
|-
| 2004 || Linkin Park || Best Rock || 
|-
|rowspan="3"|  2007 ||rowspan="2"| Linkin Park || Best Group || 
|-
| Rock Out || 
|-
| Minutes To Midnight || Album of the Year || 
|-
|rowspan="2"|  2008 || rowspan="2"| Linkin Park || Rock Out || 
|-
| Headliner || 
|-
|rowspan="2"|  2009 || rowspan="2"| Linkin Park || Best Rock || 
|-
| Best World Stage Performance || 
|-
|rowspan="2"|  2010 || rowspan="2"| Linkin Park || Best Live Act || 
|-
| Best Rock || 
|-
|rowspan="2"|  2011 || rowspan="2"| Linkin Park || Best Rock || 
|-
| Best World Stage Performance || 
|-
|rowspan="2"| 2012|| rowspan="2"| Linkin Park ||Best Rock|| 
|-
| Best North American Act || 
|-
|  2013 || Linkin Park || Best World Stage Performance || 
|-
|rowspan="2"| 2014 || rowspan="2"| Linkin Park || Best World Stage Performance || 
|-
| Best Rock ||

MTV Video Music Brazil
The MTV Video Music Brazil (VMB) are MTV Brazil's annual award ceremony, established in 1995. Linkin Park has received three awards from four nominations, thus being the biggest non-Brazilian winner of the award

|-
| 2002 || "In the End" || Best International Video || 
|-
| 2003 || "Somewhere I Belong" || Best International Video || 
|-
| 2004 || "Numb" || Best International Video || 
|-
| 2005 || "Jigga What"/"Faint" (with Jay-Z) || Best International Video || 
|-

MTV Asia Awards
The MTV Asia Awards is an annual Asian awards ceremony established in 2002 by the MTV television network. Linkin Park has received six awards from eight nominations.

|-
|rowspan="2"| 2002 || rowspan="2"|Linkin Park || Favorite Breakthrough Artist || 
|-
| Favorite Rock Act || 
|-
|rowspan="2"| 2003 || "Pts.OF.Athrty" || Favorite Video || 
|-
| Linkin Park || Favorite Rock Act || 
|-
|rowspan="2"| 2004 || "Somewhere I Belong" || Favorite Video || 
|-
| Linkin Park || Favorite Rock Act || 
|-
|rowspan="2"| 2008|| rowspan="2"|Linkin Park || Favorite International Artist of Asia || 
|-
| Bring Da House Down ||

MTV Video Music Awards
The MTV Video Music Awards were established in 1984 by MTV to celebrate the top music videos of the year. Linkin Park has received four awards from nineteen nominations.

|-
|rowspan="2"|  ||rowspan="2"| "Crawling" || Best Direction in a Video || 
|-
| Best Rock Video || 
|-
|rowspan="3"|  ||rowspan="3"| "In the End" || Best Rock Video || 
|-
| Video of the Year || 
|-
| Best Group Video || 
|-
||  || "Somewhere I Belong" || Best Rock Video || 
|-
|rowspan="2"|  || rowspan="2"| "Breaking the Habit" || Viewer's Choice Award || 
|-
| Best Rock Video || 
|-
|rowspan="3"|  ||rowspan="2"| "What I've Done" || Best Editing in a Video || 
|-
| Best Director || 
|-
| Linkin Park || Best Group || 
|-
|rowspan="3"|  ||rowspan="2"| "Shadow of the Day" || Best Rock Video || 
|-
| Best Direction || 
|-
| "Bleed It Out" || Best Special Effects || 
|-
||  || "Waiting for the End" || Best Special Effects || 
|-
|rowspan="2"| 2012 ||rowspan="2"| "Burn It Down" || Best Rock Video || 
|-
| Best Visual Effects || 
|-
|| 2014 ||| "Until It's Gone" || Best Rock Video || 
|-
|| 2018 ||| "One More Light" || Best Rock || 
|-

MTV Video Music Awards Japan
The MTV Video Music Awards Japan are the Japanese version of the MTV Video Music Awards that started in 2002 after branching out from the MTV Asia Awards.

|-
|| 2002 || Linkin Park || Best New Artist || 
|-
|rowspan="2"| 2004 || "Somewhere I Belong" || Best Rock Video || 
|-
| Meteora || Album of the Year || 
|-
|rowspan="3"| 2005 ||rowspan="2"| "Breaking the Habit" || Best Group Video || 
|-
| Best Rock Video || 
|-
| "Numb/Encore" (with Jay-Z) || Best Collaboration || 
|-
|rowspan="2"| 2008 ||rowspan="2"| "What I've Done" || Best Rock Video || 
|-
| Best Video from a Film || 
|-
|rowspan="3"| 2011 || A Thousand Suns || Album of the Year || 
|-
|rowspan="2"|"The Catalyst" || Best Group Video || 
|-
| Best Rock Video || 
|-
|| 2013 || Living Things ||  Album of the Year  ||  
|}

Los Premios MTV Latinoamérica
Los Premios MTV Latinoamérica  the Latin American version of the Video Music Awards. They were established in 2002 to celebrate the top music videos of the year in Latin America and the world.

|-
|rowspan="2"| 2002 || rowspan="2"|Linkin Park || Best New Artist — International || 
|-
|  Best Rock Artist — International || 
|-
|| 2003 || Linkin Park ||Best Rock Artist — International|| 
|-
|| 2009 || Linkin Park || Best Rock Artist — International || 
|-

MTV Fan Music Awards
The MTV Fan Music Awards is an annual awards ceremony established in 2011 by the MTV television network. Linkin Park has received two nominations in 2011.

|-
|rowspan="2"| 2011 || "The Catalyst" || Best Group Video || 
|-
| Linkin Park || Best Group || 
|-

mtvU Woodie Awards
The mtvU Woodie Awards is an annual awards show sponsored by mtvU, a division of MTV Networks. Linkin Park has received two nominations.

|-
|rowspan="2"| 2007 || Linkin Park ||The Good Woodie|| 
|-
| "What I've Done" ||Viral Woodie|| 
|-

MTV Game Awards 
The MTV Game Awards is an award given by the music channel MTV for video games. The nominations are selected by a jury consisting of established journalists and professional video game players.

|-
|| 2011 || "Blackout" || Best Song In A Video Game (FIFA 11) || 
|-

O Music Awards 
The O Music Awards are one of the major annual awards established by MTV to honor the art, creativity, personality and technology of music into the digital space. Linkin Park has received one award in 2013.

|-
|| 2013 || "Lost in the Echo" || Best Interactive Video || 
|-

Echo Awards
The Echo Awards is a German music award event which is held annually. Each year's winner is determined by the previous year's sales, Linkin Park has received four awards from nine nominations.

|-
|rowspan="2"| 2002 || rowspan="2"|Linkin Park || International Newcomer Of The Year || 
|-
| International Artist\Group Of The Year || 
|-
|| 2003 || Linkin Park ||International Artist\Group Of The Year|| 
|-
|rowspan="2"| 2004 || rowspan="2"|Linkin Park || International Artist\Group Of The Year || 
|-
| International Group Of The Year || 
|-
|rowspan="2"| 2008 || Minutes to Midnight || International\National Album Of The Year || 
|-
| Linkin Park || International Group Of The Year || 
|-
|| 2011 || Linkin Park (for A Thousand Suns) || Best International Rock\Alternative Group || 
|-
|| 2013 || Linkin Park || Best International Rock\Alternative Group || 
|-
|| 2015 || Linkin Park || Best International Rock/ Alternative Group || 
|-

Nickelodeon Kids' Choice Awards
The Nickelodeon Kids' Choice Awards is an annual awards show established in 1988 by Nickelodeon. Linkin Park has received three nominations.

|-
| 2008 || rowspan="3"|Linkin Park || Favorite Music Group || 
|-
| 2009 ||  Favorite Music Group || 
|-
| 2010 ||  Favorite Music Group || 
|-

MuchMusic Video Awards
The MuchMusic Video Awards is an annual award show which is broadcast live on Much Music. Linkin Park has received two awards from two nominations.

|-
|| 2004 || "Numb" || People's Choice: Favourite International Group || 
|-
|| 2008 || "Bleed It Out" || Best International Group Video ||

International Dance Music Awards
The International Dance Music Awards is an annual awards ceremony held by the Winter Music Conference to recognize the achievement of dance artists, producers, DJ's, radio stations and record labels. Linkin Park received three nominations.

|-
| 2005 || "Numb/Encore" (Shared with jay-Z)  || Best Alternative/Rock Dance Track || 
|-
| 2011 || "The Catalyst" (remix)|| Best Alternative/Rock Dance Track || 
|-
| 2014 || "A Light That Never Comes"|| Best Alternative/Rock Dance Track ||

NME Awards
The NME Awards is an annual music awards show in the United Kingdom, founded by the music magazine, NME.

|-
|| 2018|| Linkin Park and Friends: Celebrate Life in Honor ofChester Bennington || Music Moment of the Year|| 
|-

People's Choice Awards
The Peoples Choice Awards is an annual award show on Pop culture on Movies, TV, and Music. Linkin Park received four nominations.

|-
|| 2008  || "What I've Done" || Favorite Song from a Soundtrack: Transformers: The Album || 
|-
|| 2011 || Linkin Park || Favorite Rock Band || 
|-
|| 2012 || Linkin Park || Favorite Band || 
|-
|| 2013 || Linkin Park || Favorite Band ||

Radio Music Awards
The Radio Music Awards is an annuel award show honoring the best music in radio. Linkin Park has received two awards from three nominations.

|-
|rowspan="2"| 2004 || Linkin Park || Artist of the Year: Rock Radio || 
|-
|| "Numb" || Song of the Year: Rock Alternative Radio || 
|-
|| 2005 || Linkin Park || Artist of the Year/ Alternative and Active Rock Radio ||

Kerrang! Awards
The Kerrang! Awards is an annual awards ceremony held by Kerrang!, a British rock magazine. Linkin Park has received three awards from eight nominations.

|-
|rowspan="3"| 2001 ||rowspan="2"| Linkin Park || Best International Newcomer || 
|-
| Best Band In the World || 
|-
| "Crawling" || Best Single || 
|-
|rowspan="2"| 2003 || Linkin Park || Best International Act|| 
|-
| "Faint" || Best Single || 
|-
|| 2004 || "Breaking the Habit" || Best Single || 
|-
|| 2007 || "What I've Done" || Best Video || 
|-
|| 2009 || Linkin Park || Classic Songwriter Award || 
|-

Planeta Awards
The Planeta Awards is an annual Peruvian awards ceremony established by Radio Planeta. Linkin Park has received two awards from six nominations.

|-
|rowspan="6"| 2007 ||rowspan="2"| Linkin Park || Group of the Year || 
|-
| Rock Artist of the Year || 
|-
|rowspan="2"| "What I've Done" || The Megaplaneta of the Year || 
|-
| Rock Song of the Year || 
|-
|rowspan="2"| "Bleed It Out" || Rock Song of the Year || 
|-
| Best Male Vocal Interpretation (Chester Bennington / Mike Shinoda) || 
|-

Spike TV Awards

Spike Guys' Choice Awards 
The Spike Guys' Choice Awards is an awards show produced by the Viacom cable channel Spike and held since 2007.  It is patterned after Viacom's MTV Movie Awards.  The winners are chosen based on voting by fans and viewers of the channel. Linkin Park has received one award from one nomination.

|-
|| 2008 || Linkin Park ||Ballsiest Band|| 
|-

Spike Video Game Awards
The Spike Video Game Awards (VGA) is an annual award show hosted by Spike TV that recognizes the best computer and video games of the year. Linkin Park has received one nomination.

|-
|| 2012|| "Castle of Glass" || Best Song in a Game (Medal of Honor: Warfighter) || 
|-

ESPN Action Sports & Music Awards
The ESPN Action Sports and Music Award was a ceremony honoring both extreme athletes and the music that stimulates them. Linkin Park received an award in 2001.

|-
|| 2001|| Linkin Park || Music Artist of the Year (Motocross riding) || 
|-

TMF Awards
The TMF Awards  are an annual television awards show broadcast live on TMF (The Music Factory) in Belgium, the Netherlands, and the UK, Linkin Park has received two nominations in 2007.

|-
|rowspan="2"| 2007 || Linkin Park || Best Rock || 
|-
| Minutes To Midnight || Best Album || 
|-

NRJ Music Awards
The NRJ Music Awards is an annual awards ceremony held in Cannes, France, for popular musicians by various categories. Linkin Park has received one nomination.

|-
|| 2008 || Linkin Park ||International Group\Duo of the Year|| 
|-

Scream Awards
The Scream Awards is an award show dedicated to the (horror), (sci-fi), and (fantasy) genres of feature films.

|-
|| 2009 || "New Divide" ||Scream Song Of The Year|| 
|-

World Music Awards

The international World Music Awards honors recording artists based on worldwide sales figures provided by the International Federation of the Phonographic Industry. Linkin Park has received three awards from eleven nominations.

|-
|| 2002 || rowspan="3"|Linkin Park ||World's Best Selling Rock Group|| 
|-
|| 2003 ||World's Best Selling Rock Group|| 
|-
|| 2007 || World's Best Selling Rock Group|| 
|-
|rowspan="8"| 2014 ||rowspan="2"| Linkin Park ||World's Best Group || 
|-
| World's Best Live Act || 
|-
|| Living Things || rowspan="2"| World's Best Album || 
|-
| Recharged || 
|-
|  "Burn It Down" ||rowspan="2"| World's Best Song|| 
|-
| "A Light That Never Comes" || 
|-
| "Burn It Down" ||rowspan="2"| World's Best Video|| 
|-
| "A Light That Never Comes" ||

Teen Choice Awards
The Teen Choice Awards is an annual awards show first aired in 1999 by Fox Broadcasting Company. Linkin Park received thirteen nominations.

|-
|| 2001 || "One Step Closer" || Choice Rock Track || 
|-
|| 2002 || Hybrid Theory || Choice Album || 
|-
|| 2004 || "Somewhere I Belong" || Choice Rock Track || 
|-
|| 2005 || "Numb/Encore" || Choice Collaboration || 
|-
|rowspan="2"| 2007 || Linkin Park || Choice Rock Group || 
|-
| "What I've Done" || Choice Rock Track ||  
|-
|rowspan="2"| 2008 || Linkin Park || Choice Rock Group || 
|-
| "Shadow of the Day" || Choice Rock Track || 
|-
|| 2009 || Linkin Park || Choice Rock Group || 
|-
|rowspan="2"| 2011 || Linkin Park || Choice Rock Band || 
|-
| "Waiting for the End" || Choice Rock Track || 
|-
| 2012 || Linkin Park || Choice Rock Group || 
|-
|rowspan="2"| 2017 || Linkin Park || Choice Rock Artist || 
|-
| "Heavy" || Choice Rock Track ||

Rockbjörnen Award
Rockbjörnen is a music prize in Sweden, divided into several categories, which is awarded annually by the newspaper Aftonbladet. Linkin Park has received two awards from two nominations.

|-
|rowspan="2"| 2001 || Hybrid Theory ||The year's foreign album|| 
|-
|| Linkin Park ||The year's foreign group|| 
|-

BRIT Awards
The BRIT Awards are the British Phonographic Industry's annual pop music awards. Linkin Park have received one nomination.

|-
|| 2002 || Linkin Park ||Best International Newcomer || 
|-

Xbox Entertainment Awards

|-
|| 2013 || Linkin Park || Best Artist || 
|-

Swedish Hit Music Awards

|-
|| 2002 || Linkin Park ||Best Foreign Rock|| 
|-

Emma Awards

|-
|| 2001 || Linkin Park ||Best Foreigner Artist of The Year|| 
|-

Mnet Asian Music Awards
Mnet Asian Music Awards, otherwise abbreviated as MAMA, is an award show held by Mnet annually that credits South Korean artists, as well as foreign artists who have had an impact in the South Korean Music industry.

|-
|2002
|"Points of Authority"
|rowspan=2|Best International Artist
|
|-
|| 2003 ||"Somewhere I Belong" || 
|-

IFPI Hong Kong Top Sales Music Awards
 
|-
| 2003 || Meteora || Top 10 Best Selling Foreign Albums || 
|-
| 2005 || Collision Course (with Jay-Z) || Top 10 Best Selling Foreign Albums || 
|-
| 2007 || Minutes to Midnight || Top 10 Best Selling Foreign Albums || 
|-

Loudwire Music Awards
The Loudwire Music Awards are awarded for outstanding achievements in the rock music category. Linkin Park has received two awards from three nominations
 
|-
|rowspan="7"|2015 || The Hunting Party || Rock Album of the Year || 
|-
|| Rebellion || Rock Song of the Year || 
|-
|| Linkin Park || Rock Band of the Year || 
|-
|| Linkin Park || Live Act of the Year || 
|-
|| Linkin Park || Most Devoted Fans || 
|-
|| Chester Bennington || Best Vocalist || 
|-
|| Brad Delson || Best Guitarist || 
|-
|rowspan="1"|2017 || Chester Bennington || Best Vocalist || 
|-

Billboard Decade-End

Linkin Park has appeared on several Billboard Decade-End Charts. Linkin Park was ranked number 19 on ''Billboards 100 Best Artists of the Decade. This made Linkin Park the fifth best performing group and third best performing rock artist (behind Nickelback and Creed). Linkin Park ended the decade as the third best selling artist (behind Eminem and Britney Spears).

The band topped the decade as the Top Mainstream Rock Tracks Artist and Top Modern Rock Tracks Artist, making them the most successful rock group of the decade having accumulated over thirteen #1 hits and a total of 84 weeks at the top of both charts. Linkin Park achieved eight and four Mainstream Rock and Modern Rock Top Tracks of the decade, respectively (more than any other artist). The band was the fifth best performing artist on the Billboard 200 this decade with three #1 albums (five Top 5 albums), becoming the best charting group and rock artist of the decade on the chart. The band achieved three Top Billboard 200 albums this decade (Collision Course, Meteora, Minutes To Midnight).

{| class="wikitable sortable"  style="table-layout:fixed; width:505px;"
|-
!width="35"| Year
! style="width:200px;"| Charted Work
! style="width:220px;"| Decade-End Chart
!width="50"| Rank
|-
| style="text-align:center;" rowspan="25"| 2009
| style="text-align:center;" rowspan="3"| Linkin Park
| Billboard Artists of the Decade
| (#19)
|-
| Hot 100 Artists
| (#56)
|-
| Billboard 200 Album Artists
| (#5)
|-
| Hybrid Theory
| style="text-align:center;" rowspan="3"| Billboard 200 Albums
| (#11)
|-
| Meteora
| (#36)
|-
| Minutes To Midnight
| (#154)
|-
| Linkin Park
| Radio Songs Artists
| (#50)
|-
| "In the End"
| Radio Songs
| (#65)
|-
| Linkin Park
| Hot Digital Songs Artists
| (#36)
|-
| "What I've Done"
| Hot Digital Songs
| (#95)
|-
| "In the End"
| Pop Songs
| (#36)
|-
| Linkin Park
| Rock Songs Artists
| (#1)
|-
| "In the End"
| style="text-align:center;" rowspan="8"| Rock Songs
| (#2)
|-
| "Faint"
| (#13)
|-
| "Numb"
| (#22)
|-
| "Somewhere I Belong"
| (#33)
|-
| "One Step Closer"
| (#43)
|-
| "Crawling"
| (#45)
|-
| "What I've Done"
| (#77)
|-
| "Breaking the Habit"
| (#84)
|-
| Linkin Park
| Alternative Songs Artists
| (#1)
|-
| "In the End"
| style="text-align:center;" rowspan="4"| Alternative Songs
| (#2)
|-
| "Faint"
| (#8)
|-
| "Numb"
| (#15)
|-
| "Somewhere I Belong"
| (#24''')
|

References

External links
 Official site

Awards
Lists of awards received by American musician
Lists of awards received by musical group